The Black Whip is a 1957 American Civil War Western film directed by Charles Marquis Warren and starring Hugh Marlowe and Coleen Gray.

The film brief describes the film as "two brothers rescue four dance-hall girls, and encounter trouble from a villain wielding a wicked whip".

The film depicts the time as April 1867, when post-war derelicts, plunderers, and looters continue their crazed violence out west. The story and screenplay were written by Orville Hampton.

Sets from the "Gunsmoke" TV series were used.

Plot
John Murdock (Paul Richards) is a notorious outlaw who leads the vicious gang known as the Blacklegs. Armed with his signature black whip, he and his men invade a small town, looking to stir up trouble. In between harassing the girls at the saloon and attacking the locals, the Blacklegs are plotting a bigger scheme: kidnapping the governor of Kentucky (Patrick O'Moore) and holding him for ransom. The only man who stands in their way is former Confederate officer Lorn Crowford (Hugh Marlowe).

Cast
 Hugh Marlowe as Lorn Crawford
 Coleen Gray as Jeannie
 Adele Mara as Ruthie Dawson
 Angie Dickinson as Sally Morrow
 Richard Gilden as Dewey Crawford
 Paul Richards as John Murdock
 John Pickard as Sheriff Persons
 Dorothy Schuyler as Delilah Ware
 Charles H. Gray as Chick Hainline (as Charles Gray)
 Sheb Wooley as Bill Lassater
 Strother Martin as Thorny
 Harry Landers as Fiddler
 Patrick O'Moore as Governor
 William Hamel as Constable
 Duane Grey as Deputy Floyd (as Duane Thorsen)
 Rush Williams Jailer Garner
 Howard Culver as Dr. Gillette
 Sid Cutis as Bartender

References

External links
 
 
 

1956 films
1956 Western (genre) films
CinemaScope films
Films set in 1867
American Western (genre) films
20th Century Fox films
Films scored by Raoul Kraushaar
1950s English-language films
1950s American films
American black-and-white films